Kottanellur  is a village in Mukundapuram taluk, Thrissur district in the state of Kerala, India.

Demographics
 India census, Kottanellur had a population of 10366 with 4931 males and 5435 females.

References

Villages in Mukundapuram Taluk